Esmeralda Verdugo Romo (born 19 January 1994) is a Mexican professional footballer who plays for Club Tijuana.

Career

College
From 2014 to 2015, Verdugo played college soccer for Cerritos College, scoring 14 goals in 22 games.

Liga MX Femenil
Verdugo joined Club América from Club Tijuana in 2018. She made her debut in a 2–1 defeat to Toluca. In December 2019, Verdugo and her teammate Lucero Cuevas were victims of an express kidnapping. She subsequently rejoined Club Tijuana on loan.

Verdugo signed with Club León in June 2020. In June 2021, she rejoined Club Tijuana for a third time.

International career
Verdugo was capped for the Mexico women's national football team at the 2015 International Women's Football Tournament of Natal.

References

External links 
 

1994 births
Living people
People from Ensenada, Baja California
Mexican women's footballers
Footballers from Baja California
Mexican footballers
Women's association football forwards
Liga MX Femenil players
Club Tijuana (women) footballers
Club América (women) footballers
Club León (women) footballers
Mexico women's international footballers